Rebecca Benson (born 24 April 1990) is a Scottish actress. She has appeared in the TV crime dramas Vera and Shetland. Moreover, she appeared alongside Michael Fassbender in the 2015 film Macbeth.

Career
In 2016, she joined the HBO series Game of Thrones in Season 6 as Talla Tarly, the sister of Samwell Tarly. She also portrayed Margaret Pole, Countess of Salisbury in The White Princess.

Ms. Benson had the starring role of "Eli" in the National Theatre of Scotland production of "Let the Right One In," which opened in the United States at St. Anne's Warehouse, Brooklyn, in January 2015.

In 2019, she appeared as Melody, an intern, in Flack.

Filmography

Film

Television

Radio

Video games

References

External links

1990 births
Living people
21st-century Scottish actresses
Actresses from Edinburgh
Scottish film actresses
Scottish television actresses
Scottish stage actresses
Scottish video game actresses